Kalmakovo (Qalmaq) is a rural locality (a village) in Petrovsky Selsoviet, Ishimbaysky District, Bashkortostan, Russia. The population was 24 as of 2010. There is one street.

Geography 
Vasilyevka is the nearest rural locality.

References 

Rural localities in Ishimbaysky District